Lasiopezus nigromaculatus is an African species of Longhorn beetle in the family Cerambycidae, and found south of the Equator. It was described by Quedenfeldt in 1882.

References

Ancylonotini
Beetles described in 1882